Chanquillo or Chankillo is an ancient monumental complex in the Peruvian coastal desert, found in the Casma-Sechin basin in the Ancash Department of Peru. The ruins include the hilltop Chankillo fort, the nearby Thirteen Towers solar observatory, and residential and gathering areas. The Thirteen Towers have been interpreted as an astronomical observatory built in the 4th century BC. The culture that produced Chankillo is called the Casma/Sechin culture or the Sechin Complex.  The site was awarded UNESCO  World Heritage status in July 2021.

The site covers about four square kilometres (1.5 square miles) and has been interpreted as a fortified temple.

The Thirteen Towers solar observatory
The  regularly-spaced thirteen towers of Chankillo were constructed atop the ridge of a low hill running near north to south, forming a "toothed" horizon with narrow gaps at regular intervals. To the east and west investigators designated two possible observation points. From these vantages, the 300m long spread of the towers along the horizon corresponds very closely to the rising and setting positions of the sun over the year, albeit they are not all visible. On the winter solstice, the sun would rise behind the leftmost tower of Chankillo and rise behind each of the towers until it reached the rightmost tower six months later on the summer solstice, marking the passage of time. The Thirteen Towers of Chankillo could be the earliest known observatory in the Americas. Inhabitants of Chankillo would have been able to determine an accurate date, with an error of a day or two, by observing the sunrise or sunset from the correct tower. A contemporary site in Chincha Valley, Peru, of the late Paracas culture, which also marked the solstice, has recently been examined.

The towers had been known to travellers for 200 years but were not determined to be an astronomical site until 2007 by Iván Ghezzi and Clive Ruggles.

See also
Acaray
List of archaeoastronomical sites by country

References

External links

3D reconstruction of the site
Chankillo, Peru, Ancient Solar Observatory?
Towers point to ancient Sun cult, BBC
Giant Solar Calendar Measures Time, BBC
Early Monumental Architecture on the Peruvian Coast
Yale University article: Peruvian Citadel is Site of Earliest Ancient Solar Observatory in the Americas and slide show 
View from the air on the Chankillo site 
High-resolution image of the Thirteen Towers
Wonders of the Universe, Prof. Brian Cox, BBC (may be region locked to UK only)

Archaeological sites in Peru
Astronomical observatories in Peru
Forts in Peru
History of Peru
Archaeoastronomy
Former populated places in Peru
Archaeological sites in Ancash Region
Buildings and structures completed in the 4th century